Just Behind the Door is a 1984 Austrian drama film directed by . The film was selected as the Austrian entry for the Best Foreign Language Film at the 57th Academy Awards, but was not accepted as a nominee.

Cast
 Nicola Filippelli as Therapist
 Kurt Kosutic as Visitor
  as Molly
 Erhard Pauer as Leo
 Karl Schmid-Werter as Questioner
 Alfred Solm as Old man

See also
 List of submissions to the 57th Academy Awards for Best Foreign Language Film
 List of Austrian submissions for the Academy Award for Best Foreign Language Film

References

External links
 

1984 films
1984 drama films
1980s German-language films
Austrian drama films